The European Table Tennis Championships is an international table tennis competition for the national teams of the member associations of the European Table Tennis Union (ETTU). First held in 1958, the ETTU organised the European Championships every two years in even-numbered years until 2002, when they changed to odd-numbered years. Since 2007, the competition has been contested annually.

Editions

European Table Tennis Championships
The Championships include seven events: men's singles, doubles and team; women's singles, doubles and team, and mixed doubles. From 2009 until 2013, the mixed doubles tournament was organised separately from the other events.

In 2015, the ETTU announced that from 2016 the Championships would feature only individual events (men's singles and doubles, women's singles and doubles, and mixed doubles) in even-numbered years, with only team events taking place in odd-numbered years.

European Under-21 Table Tennis Championships

European Youth Table Tennis Championships

The European Youth Table Tennis Championships were first held in 1955 in Stuttgart. The tournament has been held yearly (except 1960, 1963, 1964). Juniors (under 18) and Cadets (under 15).

European Veterans Table Tennis Championships

 Because of lack of participants in some of events from 1995 to 2005, some of events were not held.
 Events (4) : MS/WS/MD/WD 
 Age groups (8) (40 to 90 years old) : 40+/50+/60+/65+/70+/75+/80+/85+

All time medal table

European Table Tennis Championships

European Under-21 Table Tennis Championships

European Youth Table Tennis Championships

European Veterans Table Tennis Championships

Winners

European Championships (1958–present)

European Mixed Doubles Championships (2009–2013)

Performance by nations in team competition (1958–2021)
bronze medals not complete

Men

Women

See also
 World Table Tennis Championships
 Europe Top-16
 European Under-21 Table Tennis Championships
 European Youth Table Tennis Championships

References

External links
European Table Tennis Union
International Table Tennis Federation
 https://www.ettu.org/en/events/european-youth-championships/history/ 
 https://www.ettu.org/en/events/european-youth-championships/general-information/
 http://www.tt-veterans-international.com/
 http://www.irishtabletennis.com/news/article/european_veterans_20111
 http://www.evc2007.nl/?lang=en&menu=results&page=evc_results&html=0
 http://www.tt-veterans-international.com/html/ettu.html
 http://www.tt-veterans-international.com/html/constitution.html
 https://www.ettu.org/en/events/european-veterans-championships/2017/ 
 https://www.ettu.org/en/n/news/archive/2010/2011-european-veterans-championships--last-call-for-early-entry-fee/
 https://www.ettu.org/en/n/news/archive/2011/2013-european-veterans--championships--welcome-to-bremen/
 https://web.archive.org/save/https://www.ettu.org/en/n/news/archive/2011/2013-european-veterans--championships--welcome-to-bremen/
 https://www.ettu.org/en/events/european-veterans-championships/draws---results/
 https://www.ittf.com/2019-veterans-international-calendar/
 http://www.tt-veterans-international.com/html/tournaments.html
 https://web.archive.org/save/http://www.tt-veterans-international.com/
 https://web.archive.org/web/20190503204354/https://www.ettu.org/en/events/european-veterans-championships/general-information/
 https://web.archive.org/web/20190707200438/https://www.ettu.org/en/events/european-veterans-championships/history/
 https://web.archive.org/web/20190707200447/https://www.ettu.org/en/events/european-veterans-championships/regulations---documents/
 http://evc2019.hu/ 
 https://www.ettu.org/en/events/european-teams-championships-/history---results---archive/

 
Table tennis
Table tennis competitions
Recurring sporting events established in 1958
1958 establishments in Europe